Mravići is a village in the municipality of Doboj South, Bosnia and Herzegovina.

Demographics 
According to the 2013 census, its population was 1,546.

References

Populated places in Doboj Jug
Villages in the Federation of Bosnia and Herzegovina